In mathematics, the dot product or scalar product is an algebraic operation that takes two equal-length sequences of numbers (usually coordinate vectors), and returns a single number.  In Euclidean geometry, the dot product of the Cartesian coordinates of two vectors is widely used. It is often called the inner product (or rarely projection product) of Euclidean space, even though it is not the only inner product that can be defined on Euclidean space (see  Inner product space for more).

Algebraically, the dot product is the sum of the products of the corresponding entries of the two sequences of numbers. Geometrically, it is the product of the Euclidean magnitudes of the two vectors and the cosine of the angle between them. These definitions are equivalent when using Cartesian coordinates. In modern geometry, Euclidean spaces are often defined by using vector spaces. In this case, the dot product is used for defining lengths (the length of a vector is the square root of the dot product of the vector by itself) and angles (the cosine of the angle between two vectors is the quotient of their dot product by the product of their lengths).

The name "dot product" is derived from the centered dot " · " that is often used to designate this operation; the alternative name "scalar product" emphasizes that the result is a scalar, rather than a vector, as is the case for the vector product in three-dimensional space.

Definition
The dot product may be defined algebraically or geometrically. The geometric definition is based on the notions of angle and distance (magnitude) of vectors. The equivalence of these two definitions relies on having a Cartesian coordinate system for Euclidean space.

In modern presentations of Euclidean geometry, the points of space are defined in terms of their Cartesian coordinates, and Euclidean space itself is commonly identified with the real coordinate space Rn. In such a presentation, the notions of length and angles are defined by means of the dot product. The length of a vector is defined as the square root of the dot product of the vector by itself, and the cosine of the (non oriented) angle between two vectors of length one is defined as their dot product.  So the equivalence of the two definitions of the dot product is a part of the equivalence of the classical and the modern formulations of Euclidean geometry.

Coordinate definition
The dot product of two vectors  and  specified with respect to an orthonormal basis, is defined as:

where Σ denotes summation and n is the dimension of the vector space.

Likewise, the dot product of the vector  with itself is:

If vectors are identified with column vectors, the dot product can also be written as a matrix product

Expressing the above example in this way, a 1 × 3 matrix (row vector) is multiplied by a 3 × 1 matrix (column vector) to get a 1 × 1 matrix that is identified with its unique entry:
.

Geometric definition

In Euclidean space, a Euclidean vector is a geometric object that possesses both a magnitude and a direction. A vector can be pictured as an arrow. Its magnitude is its length, and its direction is the direction to which the arrow points. The dot product of two Euclidean vectors a and b is defined by

This implies that the dot product of a vector a with itself is

which gives
 
the formula for the Euclidean length of the vector.

Scalar projection and first properties

The scalar projection (or scalar component) of a Euclidean vector a in the direction of a Euclidean vector b is given by

where  is the angle between a and b.

In terms of the geometric definition of the dot product, this can be rewritten

where  is the unit vector in the direction of b.

The dot product is thus characterized geometrically by

The dot product, defined in this manner, is homogeneous under scaling in each variable, meaning that for any scalar α,

It also satisfies a distributive law, meaning that

These properties may be summarized by saying that the dot product is a bilinear form. Moreover, this bilinear form is positive definite, which means that

is never negative, and is zero if and only if —the zero vector.

The dot product is thus equivalent to multiplying the norm (length) of b by the norm of the projection of a over b.

Equivalence of the definitions
If e1, ..., en are the standard basis vectors in Rn, then we may write

The vectors ei are an orthonormal basis, which means that they have unit length and are at right angles to each other.  Hence since these vectors have unit length

and since they form right angles with each other, if ,

Thus in general, we can say that:

Where δ  ij  is the Kronecker delta.

Also, by the geometric definition, for any vector ei and a vector a, we note

where ai is the component of vector a in the direction of ei. The last step in the equality can be seen from the figure.

Now applying the distributivity of the geometric version of the dot product gives

which is precisely the algebraic definition of the dot product.  So the geometric dot product equals the algebraic dot product.

Properties
The dot product fulfills the following properties if a, b, and c are real vectors and r is a scalar.

 Commutative:
 
 which follows from the definition (θ is the angle between a and b):
 
 Distributive over vector addition:
 
 Bilinear:
 
 Scalar multiplication:
 
 Not associative because the dot product between a scalar (a ⋅ b) and a vector (c) is not defined, which means that the expressions involved in the associative property, (a ⋅ b) ⋅ c or a ⋅ (b ⋅ c) are both ill-defined. Note however that the previously mentioned scalar multiplication property is sometimes called the "associative law for scalar and dot product" or one can say that "the dot product is associative with respect to scalar multiplication" because c (a ⋅ b) = (c a) ⋅ b = a ⋅ (c b).
 Orthogonal:
 Two non-zero vectors a and b are orthogonal if and only if .
 No cancellation:
 Unlike multiplication of ordinary numbers, where if , then b always equals c unless a is zero, the dot product does not obey the cancellation law:
 Product rule:

Application to the law of cosines

Given two vectors a and b separated by angle θ (see image right), they form a triangle with a third side . Let ,  and  denote the lengths of a, b, and c, respectively. The dot product of this with itself is:

which is the law of cosines.

Triple product

There are two ternary operations involving dot product and cross product.

The scalar triple product of three vectors is defined as

Its value is the determinant of the matrix whose columns are the Cartesian coordinates of the three vectors. It is the signed volume of the parallelepiped defined by the three vectors, and is isomorphic to the three-dimensional special case of the exterior product of three vectors.

The vector triple product is defined by

This identity, also known as Lagrange's formula, may be remembered as "ACB minus ABC", keeping in mind which vectors are dotted together. This formula has applications in simplifying vector calculations in physics.

Physics
In physics, vector magnitude is a scalar in the physical sense (i.e., a physical quantity independent of the coordinate system), expressed as the product of a numerical value and a physical unit, not just a number. The dot product is also a scalar in this sense, given by the formula, independent of the coordinate system. For example:
 Mechanical work is the dot product of force and displacement vectors,
 Power is the dot product of force and velocity.

Generalizations

Complex vectors
For vectors with complex entries, using the given definition of the dot product would lead to quite different properties. For instance, the dot product of a vector with itself could be zero without the vector being the zero vector (e.g. this would happen with the vector a = [1 i]). This in turn would have consequences for notions like length and angle. Properties such as the positive-definite norm can be salvaged at the cost of giving up the symmetric and bilinear properties of the dot product, through the alternative definition

When vectors are represented by column vectors, the dot product can be expressed as a matrix product involving a conjugate transpose, denoted with the superscript H:

In the case of vectors with real components, this definition is the same as in the real case. The dot product of any vector with itself is a non-negative real number, and it is nonzero except for the zero vector. However, the complex dot product is sesquilinear rather than bilinear, as it is conjugate linear and not linear in a. The dot product is not symmetric, since

The angle between two complex vectors is then given by

The complex dot product leads to the notions of Hermitian forms and general inner product spaces, which are widely used in mathematics and physics.

The self dot product of a complex vector , involving the conjugate transpose of a row vector, is also known as the norm squared, after the Euclidean norm; it is a vector generalization of the absolute square of a complex scalar (see also: squared Euclidean distance).

Inner product

The inner product generalizes the dot product to abstract vector spaces over a field of scalars, being either the field of real numbers  or the field of complex numbers .

The inner product of two vectors over the field of complex numbers is, in general, a complex number, and is sesquilinear instead of bilinear. An inner product space is a normed vector space, and the inner product of a vector with itself is real and positive-definite.

Functions
The dot product is defined for vectors that have a finite number of entries.

This notion can be generalized to continuous functions: just as the inner product on vectors uses a sum over corresponding components, the inner product on functions is defined as an integral over some interval  (also denoted ):

Weight function
Inner products can have a weight function (i.e., a function which weights each term of the inner product with a value).

Dyadics and matrices
A double-dot product for matrices is the Frobenius inner product, which is analogous to the dot product on vectors. It is defined as the sum of the products of the corresponding components of two matrices A and B of the same size:

 (For real matrices)

Writing a matrix as a dyadic, we can define a different double-dot product (see ,) however it is not an inner product.

Tensors
The inner product between a tensor of order n and a tensor of order m is a tensor of order , see Tensor contraction for details.

Computation

Algorithms

The straightforward algorithm for calculating a floating-point dot product of vectors can suffer from catastrophic cancellation. To avoid this, approaches such as the Kahan summation algorithm are used.

Libraries

A dot product function is included in:
 BLAS level 1  real SDOT, DDOT; complex CDOTU, ZDOTU = X^T * Y, CDOTC ZDOTC = X^H * Y
 Julia as   
 Matlab as    or    or   
 Python (package NumPy) as     or     
 GNU Octave as   
 Intel oneAPI Math Kernel Library real p?dot  dot  = sub(x)'*sub(y); complex p?dotc dotc  = conjg(sub(x)')*sub(y)

See also
 Cauchy–Schwarz inequality
 Cross product
 Dot product representation of a graph
 Euclidean norm, the square-root of the self dot product
 Matrix multiplication
 Metric tensor
 Multiplication of vectors
 Outer product

Notes

References

External links

 
 Explanation of dot product including with complex vectors
 "Dot Product" by Bruce Torrence, Wolfram Demonstrations Project, 2007.

Articles containing proofs
Bilinear forms
Operations on vectors
Analytic geometry
Tensors
Scalars